During the 1932–33 season Hibernian, a football club based in Edinburgh, came first out of 20 clubs in the Scottish Second Division and won promotion to the Scottish First Division.

Scottish Second Division

Final League table

Armadale & Bo'ness were expelled from the Scottish Football League for failing to meet match guarantees; their records were expunged.

Scottish Cup

See also
List of Hibernian F.C. seasons

References

External links
Hibernian 1932/1933 results and fixtures, Soccerbase

Hibernian F.C. seasons
Hibernian